Chen Yi (born November 12, 1986, in Taipei) is a professional tennis player.

On April 16, 2007 she reached a career high ranking of 377 in singles. On October 19, 2009 she reached a career high ranking of 116 in doubles.

She has won 18 doubles titles on the ITF circuit, her biggest was at the Ningbo Challenger where the event was classified as a $100,000+H level.

She has played at WTA tour levels before including a 6–4, 6–2 loss to eventual winners Serena and Venus Williams at the 2009 Bank of the West Classic partnering Mashona Washington.

ITF Circuit Finals

Singles Finals: 3 (0–3)

Doubles Finals: 32 (18-14)

External links

References

Living people
1986 births
Taiwanese female tennis players
Sportspeople from Taipei
21st-century Taiwanese women